Hana Lišková (born 4 June 1952) is a Czech former gymnast. She finished in second and fifth place with the Czech teams at the 1968 and 1972 Summer Olympics, respectively. In 1968 she was ranked 10–13th in all her individual events.

References

1952 births
Living people
Czech female artistic gymnasts
Olympic gymnasts of Czechoslovakia
Gymnasts at the 1968 Summer Olympics
Gymnasts at the 1972 Summer Olympics
Olympic silver medalists for Czechoslovakia
Olympic medalists in gymnastics
Gymnasts from Prague
Medalists at the 1968 Summer Olympics